Mangal Kalindi is an Indian politician and member of the Jharkhand Mukti Morcha. Kalindi is a member of the Jharkhand Legislative Assembly from the Jugsalai constituency in East Singhbhum district.

References 

People from East Singhbhum district
Jharkhand Mukti Morcha  politicians
Members of the Jharkhand Legislative Assembly
Living people
21st-century Indian politicians
Year of birth missing (living people)
Jharkhand MLAs 2019–2024